Qaraməmmədli (also, Karamamedli) is a village and municipality in the Agsu Rayon of Azerbaijan.  It has a population of 358. The municipality consists of the villages of Qaraməmmədli and Navahı.

References 

Populated places in Agsu District